The 2014–15 Southeastern Louisiana Lady Lions basketball team represented Southeastern Louisiana University during the 2014–15 NCAA Division I women's basketball season. The Lady Lions, led by first year head coach Yolanda Moore, played their home games at the University Center. They are members of the Southland Conference.

Roster

Schedule
Source

|-
!colspan=9 style="background:#006643; color:#EAAB00;"| Out of Conference Schedule

|-
!colspan=9 style="background:#006643; color:#EAAB00;"| Southland Conference Schedule

See also
 2014–15 Southeastern Louisiana Lions basketball team

References

Southeastern Louisiana Lady Lions basketball seasons
Southeastern Louisiana
Southeastern Louisiana
Southeastern Louisiana